Gage William Creed is a fictional character created by Stephen King who is the primary antagonist of his 1983 novel Pet Sematary. In the novel, Gage is an innocent child who is killed by a speeding tanker truck accidentally. Gage's grieving father Louis brings him back to life by burying him in the titular cemetery, which is possessed by a Wendigo. Once reanimated, Gage is controlled by the Wendigo's evil spirit and murders his mother, Rachel, and their neighbor, Jud Crandall. Gage was portrayed in the 1989 film adaptation of the novel by Miko Hughes. He was portrayed in the 2019 remake by twins Hugo and Lucas Lavoie. Gage was also portrayed in a small cameo appearance by his creator, Stephen King, in the 1997 miniseries adaptation of The Shining. Gage is briefly mentioned in the novel Insomnia, though he never makes an appearance.

Fictional character biography 
Gage Creed is the 2-year-old son of Louis and Rachel Creed and the younger brother to Ellie Creed. Before his death and eventual resurrection, Gage appears to be a typical toddler. He and his family move to Ludlow, Maine from Chicago, Illinois and become friends with their neighbor Jud Crandall. However, the family notices that their new house is located right next to a busy highway and there is a cemetery for animals in their backyard called the "Pet Sematary". One day, the Creeds and Jud are having a picnic in their yard, and Gage is playing with a kite. The kite begins blowing away and Gage starts chasing it, unaware he is heading into the busy highway. His father tries to catch up to him but did not make it in time, Gage is struck and killed by a speeding tanker truck. In his grief, Louis takes his son to the ancient burial ground introduced to him by Jud after their cat, Church, was killed. Louis buries Gage there, and his son is possessed
by the spirit of a Wendigo and resurrected.

Once Gage returns to life, he murders Jud and calls for his mother to come to him. He then kills his mother and taunts his father. Louis then puts his son out of his misery by injecting him with a lethal dose of morphine.

Inspiration and adaptations 
The original inspiration for the character was King's own son, Owen, who, as a toddler, had been stopped from running into the road while flying a kite. The King family was then staying in a spooky house in Orrington, Maine – a place which had a real pet cemetery.

Gage is portrayed in the 1989 film adaptation by Miko Hughes. While the film itself garnered mixed reviews, Hughes' portrayal of Gage was universally acclaimed for the chilling performance given by such a small child. Two-year old Russell Graves also played the part as a stand-in and double for Hughes. Graves was cast when the film was shot on location in Ellsworth, Maine and appears as Gage in the kite-flying scene. A mannequin was also used to portray the character in scenes after he has been reanimated.

In the 2019 remake, Gage was portrayed by twins Hugo and Lucas Lavoie. In this adaptation, Gage and Ellie switch roles; Ellie is killed by the tanker, only to be reanimated as a murderous revenant, and tries to kill her entire family. Gage ends up being the only assumed survivor of the story, as each member of the Creed family is killed by Ellie and possessed by the Wendigo. The film ends with Gage safely in a car with the possessed Creed family returning to the car, motioning for Gage to unlock the car door.

Gage was portrayed in a small cameo appearance by his creator, Stephen King, in the 1997 miniseries adaptation of The Shining. In the cameo, Gage appears as an orchestra conductor during one of Jack Torrance's hallucinations.

Reception 
The death of Gage in King's original novel was described by many at the time as "shocking" and "heartbreaking". The character's eventual turn into the primary antagonist of the story led to him being considered as one of the best and creepiest Stephen King characters/villains. The portrayal of the character in the 1989 film by Miko Hughes was widely praised despite the film itself receiving mixed reviews.

Literary analysis 
Gage Creed has also been the subject of scholar works discussing what he represents. In Frankenstein's Monster: Hubris and Death in Stephen King's Oeuvre, Strengell draws parallels between Gage Creed and Frankenstein's monster. Both Gage and the Creature suffer the consequences of their father's/creator's hubris when defying God and attempting to create life. The Creature is driven to evil by hardship, whereas Gage has had his soul replaced entirely by evil. According to Bruhm in Nightmare on Sesame Street: or, The Self-Possessed Child,  Gage represents the loss of innocence when he is resurrected as a creature wise beyond his years. In theory this is worse than his father's initial fears of bringing back a brain-dead couch potato. Gage might have remained somewhat innocent and free of cultural corruption like Rousseau's Emile, but children cannot remain innocent because obtaining knowledge is not only inevitable, but imperative.

References 

Pet Sematary
Stephen King characters
Fictional child deaths
Fictional demons and devils
Male literary villains
Male horror film villains
Literary characters introduced in 1983
Male characters in film
Male characters in literature
Fictional murderers
Fictional matricides
Fictional zombies and revenants
Filicide in fiction
Characters in American novels of the 20th century
Fictional characters from Chicago